Zakef may refer to:

Zakef katon, a trope sound from the Katon group
Zakef gadol, a common independent trope